The emblem of the United Arab Emirates was officially adopted on 9 December 1973 (2 years after independence in 1971); it was later modified in 2008. It is similar to the coats of arms and emblems of other Arab states.

It consists of a golden falcon (Hawk of Quraish) with a disk in the middle, which shows the UAE flag and seven stars representing the seven Emirates of the federation. The falcon has 7 tail feathers also representing the 7 Emirates. The falcon holds with its talons a red parchment bearing the name of the federation in Kufic script.

Prior to March 22, 2008, when the emblem was modified, the falcon had a red disk, which showed an Arab sailboat in its interior, surrounded by a chain.

Subnational representatives
The United Arab Emirates is a federation of seven emirates, each of which has its own coat of arms / wordmark logos, while some has both.

References

External links 
Emblem Of UAE Animal

United Arab Emirates
National symbols of the United Arab Emirates
United Arab Emirates
United Arab Emirates